Henry Charles Lowe (20 March 1886 – 1958) was a footballer who played for Liverpool in the early 20th century.

External links
Player profile at LFChistory.net

1886 births
1958 deaths
English footballers
Liverpool F.C. players
Nottingham Forest F.C. players
People from Whitwell, Derbyshire
Footballers from Derbyshire
English Football League players
Gainsborough Trinity F.C. players
Nottingham Forest F.C. wartime guest players
Grantham Town F.C. players
Mansfield Town F.C. players
Newark Town F.C. players
Date of death missing
Association football wing halves